Muhammad Ali (1942–2016) was an American boxer.

Mohammad Ali or Muhammad Ali may also refer to:

People

Literature 
 Muhammad Ali Siddiqui, (1938–2013), Pakistani literary critic
 Mohammed Naseehu Ali (born 1971), Ghanaian-born author
 Taha Muhammad Ali (1931–2011), Palestinian poet
 Muhammad Ali (writer) (1874–1951), also known as Maulana Muhammad Ali, religious scholar and leading figure of Ahmadiyya Islamic movement
 Mohamed Abdulkarim Ali (b. 1985), Somali-Canadian writer

Music 
 Muhammad Ali (drummer) (born 1936), free jazz drummer
 Mohammed Ali (duo), a Swedish rap duo made of Moms and Alias Ruggig (also part of Swedish hip hop collective Ayla)
 Mohammad Ali Siddiqui (1944–2014), Bangladeshi playback singer
 Mohamed Ali (singer) (born 1993), Danish singer of Egyptian and Iraqi origin

Politics 
 Muhammad Ali of Egypt (1769–1849), viceroy of Egypt
 Muhammad Ali, Prince of the Sa'id (born 1979), Prince of the Sa'id
 Mohammed Ali Khan Walajah (1717–1795), Nawab of Arcot in India
 Muhammad ibn Ali as-Senussi (1787–1859), founder of the Senussi order
 Mohammad Ali Shah Qajar (1872–1925), Shah of Iran
 Mohammad Ali Jauhar (1878–1931), Muslim Indian political leader, journalist, and poet
 Muhammad Ali Bogra (1909–1963), Prime Minister of Pakistan
 Mohammad Ali (Bangladeshi politician) (–2020), Bangladeshi politician
 Muhammad Ali (Brunei) (died 1661), twelfth sultan of Brunei in 1660, murdered
 Mohammad Ali (Kenyan politician) (born 1974), Kenyan politician also known as Moha Jicho Pevu
 Mohammad Ali (Pakistani politician), Pakistani politician from Upper Dir District
 Mohammad Ali (Telangana) (born 1952), Deputy Chief Minister of Telangana, India since 2014
 Mohammed Ali Tewfik (1875–1955), Regent of Egypt during the minority of Farouk of Egypt
 Muhammad Ali Wazir, Pakistani politician and leader of the Pashtun Tahafuz Movement
 Mohammad Ali (aka Muawiyah), key leader of Jemaah Islamiyah, killed in January 2012
 Mohamed Ali Houmed, Djibouti politician
 Muhammad Ali Jinnah (1876–1948), founder of Pakistan
 Mohamed Ali (Egyptian contractor) (born 1974), famous for his September 2019 videos provoking mass street protests in Egypt
 Mohammad Ali Ramazani Dastak (1963–2020), Iranian politician
 Mohammad Mosaddak Ali (born 1960), Bangladeshi entrepreneur and politician
 Chaudhry Muhammad Ali (1905–1980), Prime Minister of Pakistan
 Dusé Mohamed Ali (1866–1945), African nationalist
 Safaa Mohammed Ali (1982–2005), Iraqi militant and Al-Qaeda member

Sports
 Mohammad Ali (cricketer, born 1973), Pakistani cricketer
 Mohammad Ali (cricketer, born 1982), Pakistani cricketer
 Mohammad Ali (cricketer, born 1989), Pakistani cricketer
 Mohammad Ali (cricketer, born 1992), Pakistani cricketer
 Mohamed Ali (footballer) (active from 2015), Indian footballer
 Mohamed Aly (boxer) (born 1975), Egyptian boxer
 Mohamed Ali Diallo (born 1978), Burkinan soccer player
 Muhammad Ali (British boxer) (born 1996), British boxer
 Muhammad Ali (Pakistani boxer) (born 1933), Pakistani boxer
 Mohamed Ali Camara (born 1997), Guinean footballer
 Muhammad Ali (footballer, born 1985)
 Muhammad Ali (footballer, born 1989), Pakistani international footballer
 Ali Muhammed (born 1983), Turkish naturalized basketball player
 Mohamed Ali Messaoud (born 1953), Algerian former footballer

Other people
 Mohammad Ali (actor) (1931–2006), Pakistani actor
 Mohammad Sadat Ali, Bengali academic killed by the Pakistan army during the Bangladesh Liberation war
 Mohammad Shamshad Ali, Bangladeshi physician killed in the Bangladesh Liberation war
 Mohammed Ali bin Johari (1976–2008), a notorious convicted killer from Singapore
 Usman bin Haji Muhammad Ali (1943–1968), alias Janatin, an Indonesian soldier and terrorist
 Muhammad Ali Mungeri (1846–1927), Indian Muslim scholar who was the founder and first rector of Nadwatul Ulama
 Norishyam Mohamed Ali (1972–1999), Singaporean convicted murderer executed for a Bulgarian student's murder

Places 
 Mohammad Ali, Behbahan, a village in Iran
 Mohammad Ali, Lali, a village in Iran

Other uses
 "Muhammad Ali" (song), a 2001 single by the British dance band Faithless
 Muhammad-Ali, the individuals Muhammad and Ali who exist as a single entity, or light of Aql
 Black Superman (Johnny Wakelin song) (the lyrics repeat Ali's name more than the actual title)
 Louisville International Airport, officially known as Louisville Muhammad Ali International Airport since 2019
 Muhammad Ali (miniseries), a 2021 documentary series directed by Ken Burns

See also 
 Ali (disambiguation)
 Ali Mohamed (disambiguation)
 Mehmet Ali (disambiguation)
 Mohammed Ali Shah (disambiguation)
 Muhammad (name)